Brigitte Bierlein (born 25 June 1949) is an Austrian former jurist who served as president of the Constitutional Court before serving as chancellor of Austria from June 2019 until January 2020. An Independent, she was the first woman to hold either office.

Bierlein served as the advocate general of the Procurator's Office – essentially the country's chief public prosecutor – from 1990 to 2002, as well as a member of the executive board of the International Association of Prosecutors from 2001 to 2003. In 2003, Bierlein was made a member and the vice president of the Constitutional Court.

Following the Ibiza affair, President Alexander Van der Bellen named Bierlein Chancellor of Austria, after a parliamentary motion of no confidence dismissed the first government of Sebastian Kurz, the first successful motion of no confidence in Austrian modern history. She was the first woman to assume the role and served until the next government led by Kurz was sworn in following the legislative election which took place on 29 September 2019.

Early life 
Brigitte Bierlein was born on 25 June 1949 in Vienna during the Allied occupation of Austria. Her father was a civil servant. Her mother, trained as an artist, was a homemaker. She was educated at the Gymnasium Kundmanngasse, from which she graduated in 1967. Bierlein originally wanted to study either art or architecture and came close to joining the University of Applied Arts. However, she ultimately chose to study law instead, partly on the advice of her mother and partly because she did not want to be a financial burden on her parents any longer than necessary. Bierlein enrolled at the University of Vienna, receiving her doctorate of law in 1971.

Judicial career 
Bierlein served for four years as a candidate judge, before she was officially elevated to the judiciary in 1975.
She spent the next two years presiding over trial courts, first the District Court Innere Stadt and then the District Tribunal Vienna, a criminal court that has since been dissolved.

In the former position, she mostly dealt with cases at tenancy law, an area that appears to have bored her greatly.

In 1977, Bierlein left the bench to join the Vienna Public Prosecutor's Office. She was responsible for general and political criminal cases as well as for criminal cases pursuant to media law, a type of proceedings customarily handled by dedicated specialists in Austria. In 1986, Bierlein was promoted to the Vienna Chief Public Prosecutor's Office. She was now a distinguished civil servant attached to one of the country's five most senior criminal chambers. In 1987, she spent a few months working in the Department of Criminal Law in the Ministry of Justice, then returned to her position in the prosecution service.

In 1990, she was appointed advocate general of the Procurator's Office, the section of the prosecution service attached directly to the Supreme Court. 
She was the first woman to serve in this position.

The same year, Bierlein became a member of the board of examiners for judges and prosecutors at the Vienna Higher Regional Court, a position she would hold until 2010.

In 1995, Bierlein was appointed to the executive board of the Association of Austrian Prosecutors. From 2001 to 2003, she served as the association's president. Also from 2001 to 2003, she held a seat on the executive board of the International Association of Prosecutors.

In 2002, the first Schüssel government recommended Bierlein for appointment as vice president of the Constitutional Court.
The move was not uncontroversial at the time. Bierlein had prosecuted crime with great fervor but had not distinguished herself as a legal scholar; she is in fact considered indifferent as a theorist to this day. Opposition politicians such as Josef Cap accused the government of passing over multiple more competent candidates in favor of a partisan hack. Bierlein supporters such as Maria Fekter countered that Bierlein's appointment would be an important step towards gender equality in Austria.

According to the well-known Austrian law professor , Bierlein owed her career at the Constitutional Court to the Austrian politician Jörg Haider and her life partner, the Austrian judge Ernest Maurer, a close friend of Jörg Haider.

Assenting to the cabinet's recommendation, President Thomas Klestil appointed Bierlein on 21 November 2002, the appointment to be effective 1 January 2003. 
Once again, Bierlein was the first woman to serve in the role she was being elevated to.
In fact, there had been no women at all on the Constitutional Court until 1995.

Bierlein took over from the president of the court, Gerhart Holzinger, when he retired from the bench effective 31 December 2017.

On the initiative of the Freedom Party, the right-of-center first Kurz government moved to turn her interim position into a permanent one.
President Alexander Van der Bellen confirmed Bierlein as the new president of the Constitutional Court on 23 February 2018.
Bierlein's previous role as vice president passed on to Supreme Court justice Christoph Grabenwarter. 
Wolfgang Brandstetter, who had formerly been vice chancellor and minister of justice on a People's Party ticket, was appointed to fill the vacancy of the Court.

Bierlein reached the mandatory retirement age of 70 in 2019.

Politics 
Bierlein has no political affiliation. She is seen as solidly right of centre. During her time as a prosecutor, she was noted for her hardline tough-on-crime stance, although her years on the bench have earned her a reputation for civility and for working well with ideological opponents.
Commentators from both sides of the political spectrum note Bierlein's close ties to both People's Party and Freedom Party, as well as the fact that her career owes both its unexpected major breaks to right-of-centre coalition governments.

Bierlein herself acknowledges both her toughness as a prosecutor and her socially conservative bent in general. In response to doubts about her ability to remain above the fray as a Constitutional Court justice, she claims to be as committed to impartiality as any other professional judge and also points out that she has never actually joined any party.

In December 2017 the Austrian Constitutional Court with Bierlein as president ruled to introduce same-sex marriage on 1 January 2019.

After the first Kurz government lost a parliamentary vote of no-confidence on 27 May 2019 following the Ibiza affair, Alexander Van der Bellen, the president of Austria, named Bierlein as Kurz's successor. She became the first female chancellor of Austria and was in office until the next government was formed following the National Council elections on 29 September 2019. Bierlein's appointment was agreed with all political parties in the National Council. She became the second independent to serve as a chancellor after Johannes Schober, who was in office twice between 1921 and 1930, and the first in Austria's post-war history.

Personal life 
Bierlein is unmarried and has no children. Her long-time partner was Ernest Maurer, a retired judge, who died in 2021. Bierlein is a supporter of the arts. She owns contemporary paintings, although she does not consider herself a collector. She also attends theatre and opera performances as well as museums. She enjoys skiing and sailing. In June 2020, Bierlein was pulled over on suspicion of driving while intoxicated. She was forced to surrender her driver's licence for four weeks and has since issued an apology.

Honours 
 Austrian honours
  Grand Decoration of Honor in Silver with Sash of the Decoration of Honour for Services to the Republic of Austria
  Grand Decoration of Honor in Gold with Sash of the Decoration of Honour for Services to the Republic of Austria (16 June 2021)

References

External links 

 Brigitte BIERLEIN at the Constitutional Court homepage

1949 births
20th-century Austrian women
21st-century Austrian women
21st-century Chancellors of Austria
21st-century Austrian women politicians
21st-century Austrian politicians
Austrian jurists
Austrian prosecutors
Austrian women judges
Constitutional court women judges
Female heads of government
Living people
Politicians from Vienna
Presidents of the Constitutional Court of Austria
University of Vienna alumni
Vice presidents of the Constitutional Court of Austria